Mass destruction may refer to:

 The effect of a weapon of mass destruction that can kill a large number of humans or cause great damage
 "Mass Destruction" (song), by Faithless, 2004 
 Mass Destruction (video game), 1997 
 "Mass Destruction", a song from the video game Persona 3, 2006

See also 

 Mass killing